Hideki Kikuchi (菊地 栄樹 , born 27 January 1986 in Hiroshima) is a Japanese archer. At the 2012 Summer Olympics he competed for his country in the Men's team event obtaining the 6th place in Team competition and 66th place in Individual competition.

References

Japanese male archers
1986 births
Living people
Olympic archers of Japan
Archers at the 2012 Summer Olympics
Sportspeople from Hiroshima
Archers at the 2010 Asian Games
Archers at the 2014 Asian Games
World Archery Championships medalists
Asian Games competitors for Japan